Mohammad Ajmal Khan (11 February 1868 – 29 December 1927), better known as Hakim Ajmal Khan, was a physician in Delhi, India, and one of the founders of the Jamia Millia Islamia University. He also founded another institution, Ayurvedic and Unani Tibbia College, better known as Tibbia College, situated in Karol Bagh, Delhi. He was the only muslim to chair a session of the Hindu Mahasabha. He became the university's first chancellor in 1920 and remained in office until his death in 1927.

Biography
Born on 11 February 1868 (17 Shawwal 1284), Khan descended from a line of physicians who had come to India during the reign of Mughal Emperor Babar. His family were all Unani doctors (hakims who had practised this ancient form of medicine since their arrival in the country. They were then known as the Rais of Delhi. His grandfather, Hakim Sharif Khan, was a physician to Mughal Emperor, Shah Alam and had built the Sharif Manzil, a hospital-cum-college teaching Unani medicine.

Hakim Ajmal Khan learnt the Quran by heart and as a child studied traditional Islamic knowledge including Arabic and Persian, before turning his energy to the study of medicine under the guidance of his senior relatives, all of whom were well-known physicians. To promote the practice of Tibb-i-Unani or Unani medicine, his grandfather had set up the Sharif Manzil hospital-cum-college known throughout the subcontinent as one of the best philanthropic Unani hospitals where treatment for poor patients was free. He completed his Unani studies under Hakeem Abdul Jameel of Siddiqui Dawakhana, Delhi.

On qualifying in 1892, Hakim Ajmal Khan became chief physician to the Nawab of Rampur. Hailed as "Massiha-e-Hind" (Healer of India) and "a king without a crown". Hakim Ajmal Khan, like his father, was reputed to effect miraculous cures and to have possessed a "magical" medicine chest, the secrets of which were known to him alone.
Such was his medical acumen that it is said that he could diagnose any illness by just looking at a person's face. Hakim Ajmal Khan charged Rs. 1000 per day for an out-of-town visit but if the patient came to Delhi, he was treated free, regardless of his position in society.

Khan proved to be the most outstanding and multifaceted personality of his era with matchless contributions to the causes of Indian independence, national integration and communal harmony.

He took great interest in the expansion and development of the native system of Unani medicine and to that end built three important institutions, the Central College in Delhi, the Hindustani Dawakhana and the Ayurvedic and Unani Tibbia College better known as Tibbia College, Delhi, which expanded research and practice in the field and saved the Unani System of Medicine from extinction in India. His untiring efforts in this field infused a new force and life into an otherwise decaying Unani medical system under British rule. Khan proposed the absorption of Western concepts within the Unani system, a view diametrically opposite to that adopted by physicians of the Lucknow school who wanted to maintain the system's purity.

Hakim Ajmal Khan also recognised the talents of chemist Dr. Salimuzzaman Siddiqui, whose subsequent research into important medicinal plants used in the field gave Unani medicine a new direction.

As one of its founders, Khan was elected first chancellor of the Jamia Milia Islamia University on 22 November 1920, holding the position until his death in 1927. During this period he oversaw the University's move to Delhi from Aligarh and helped it to overcome various crises, including financial ones, when he carried out extensive fund raising and often bailed it out using his own money.

Politics 
Hakim Ajmal Khan changed from medicine to politics after he started writing for the Urdu weekly Akmal-ul-Akhbar launched by his family. Khan also headed the Muslim team who met the Viceroy of India in Simla in 1906 and presented him with a memorandum written by the delegation. At the end of December 1906, he actively participated at the Dhaka founding of the All India Muslim League on 30 December 1906. At a time when many Muslim leaders faced arrest, Khan approached Mahatma Gandhi for help in 1917, thereafter uniting with him and other Muslim leaders such as Maulana Azad, Maulana Mohammad Ali Jauhar and Maulana Shaukat Ali in the well-known Khilafat movement. Khan was also the sole person elected to the Presidency of the Indian National Congress, the Muslim League and the All India Khilafat Committee.

Death and legacy 

Before he died of heart problems on 29 December 1927, Hakim Ajmal Khan had renounced his government title, and many of his Indian followers awarded him the title of Masih-ul-Mulk (Healer of the Nation). He was succeeded to the position of Jamia Millia Islamia Chancellor by Mukhtar Ahmed Ansari.

Ajmaline, a class Ia antiarrhythmic agent and Ajmalan a parent hydride, are named after him.

After the partition of India, Khan's grandson Hakim Muhammad Nabi Khan moved to Pakistan. Hakim Nabi had learnt Tibb (how to practice medicine) from his grandfather and opened 'Dawakhana Hakim Ajmal Khan' in Lahore which has branches throughout Pakistan. The motto of the Ajmal Khan family is Azal-ul-Allah-Khudatulmal, which means that the best way to keep oneself busy is by serving humanity.

Quotes
 "The spirit of non-cooperation pervades throughout the country and there is no true Indian heart even in the remotest corner of this great country which is not filled with the spirit of cheerful suffering and sacrifice to attain Swaraj and see the Punjab and the Khilafat wrongs redressed." – From the Presidential Address, Indian National Congress, 1921 Session, Ahmedabad.

See also
 Ajmal Khan Park, New Delhi, adjacent to Tibbia College was named after him

References

Further reading

 Hakim Ajmal Khan, the versatile genius, by Mohammed Abdur Razzack. Central Council for Research in Unani Medicine, Ministry of Health & Family Welfare, Govt. of India, 1987.
 Hakim Ajmal Khan by Zafar Ahmed Nizami, Publications Division, Ministry of Information and Broadcasting, Govt. of India, 1988.
 Hakim Ajmal Khan(Indian freedom fighters series), by Shri Ram Bakshi. Anmol Publications, 1996. .
 Hakim Ajmal Khan (Hindi, Urdu and English Version) by Hakim Syed Zillur Rahman, National Book Trust, Government of India, New Delhi, India, 2004.

External links

'Dawakhana Hakim Ajmal Khan, Lahore website
 'Dawakhana Hakim Ajmal Khan Online Store, International website & Buy Medicines Online
 Hakim Ajmal Khan (1863–1927): Medicine, Freedom Fighter

1863 births
1927 deaths
Medical doctors from Delhi
19th-century Indian Muslims
Indian independence activists from Delhi
Jamia Millia Islamia
19th-century Indian educational theorists
Presidents of the Indian National Congress
19th-century Indian medical doctors
All India Muslim League members
Leaders of the Pakistan Movement
Unani practitioners
South Asian traditional medicine
Founders of Indian schools and colleges
20th-century Indian medical doctors
20th-century Indian educational theorists
Scholars from Delhi
Indian National Congress politicians from Delhi